Arthur Albert (born Arturo Albert on July 9, 1946) is an American cinematographer, television director, and actor.

Career
As a cinematographer, he has photographed for number of notable films including Night of the Comet (1984), The Principal (1987), Surf Ninjas (1993), Dirty Work (1998), Max Keeble's Big Move (2001) and among other films. He has worked with director Dennis Dugan on three films Happy Gilmore (1996), Beverly Hills Ninja (1997) and Saving Silverman (2001).

Albert has also worked in episodic television. Working as cinematographer on the television series The Wonder Years, ER and The Gates. He also directed episodes of all of those series. His other television cinematography credits include ABC Weekend Special, The District, The $treet and The Glades, Breaking Bad, Better Call Saul, Still Star-Crossed. Albert was also the cinematographer of the 1986 TV movie My Two Loves.

In 2001, he directed the short film Dating in L.A., his only film directing credit to date.

Awards and education
In 1997, he was nominated for a Directors Guild of America award for directing an episode of the CBS children's series Bailey Kipper's P.O.V.  He is an alum of Columbia University (1969).

References

External links

1946 births
American cinematographers
American television directors
Columbia University alumni
Living people
People from Caracas
Venezuelan emigrants to the United States